The Lancer 30 Mark II, or Lancer 30-2, is an American sailboat that was designed by the Canadian design firm C&C Design as a cruiser and first built in 1977.

Like the Lancer 29 Mark III, the Lancer 30 Mark II is a development of the C&C 30 which itself was built in Mark I and II versions.

Production
The design was built by Lancer Yachts in the United States between 1977 and 1982, but it is now out of production.

Design
The Lancer 30 Mark II is a recreational keelboat, built predominantly of fiberglass, with wood trim. It has a masthead sloop rig, an internally mounted spade-type rudder and a fixed fin keel. It displaces  and carries  of ballast.

See also
List of sailing boat types

Related development
C&C 30
Lancer 29 Mark III

References

Keelboats
1970s sailboat type designs
Sailing yachts
Sailboat type designs by C&C Design
Sailboat types built by Lancer Yachts